Mercy Otis Warren (September 14, [September 25, New Style] 1728 – October 19, 1814) was an American activist poet, playwright, and pamphleteer during the American Revolution. During the years before the Revolution, she had published poems and plays that attacked royal authority in Massachusetts and urged colonists to resist British infringements on colonial rights and liberties. She was married to James Warren, who was likewise heavily active in the independence movement.

During the debate over the United States Constitution in 1788, she issued a pamphlet, Observations on the new Constitution, and on the Federal and State Conventions written under the pseudonym "A Columbian Patriot", that opposed ratification of the document and advocated the inclusion of a Bill of Rights. Observations was long thought to be the work of other writers, most notably Elbridge Gerry. It was not until one of her descendants, Charles Warren, found a reference to it in a 1787 letter to British historian Catharine Macaulay that Warren was accredited authorship. In 1790, she published a collection of poems and plays under her own name, a highly unusual occurrence for a woman at the time. In 1805, she published one of the earliest histories of the American Revolution, a three-volume History of the Rise, Progress, and Termination of the American Revolution.

Early life

Warren was born on September 7, 1728 (old style), the third of thirteen children and first daughter of Colonel James Otis (1702–1778) and Mary (Allyne) Otis (1702–1774). Only six of her siblings survived to adulthood. The family lived in West Barnstable, Massachusetts. Her mother was a descendant of Mayflower passenger Edward Doty. Her father was a farmer and attorney, who served as a judge for the Barnstable County Court of Common Pleas. He won election to the Massachusetts House of Representatives in 1745. He was an outspoken opponent of British rule and the appointed colonial governor, Thomas Hutchinson.

The Otis children were "raised in the midst of revolutionary ideals". Although Mercy had no formal education, she studied with the Reverend Jonathan Russell while he tutored her brothers Joseph and James in preparation for college. Unlike most girls of the time who were simply literate, Warren most likely paved the way for her to break the traditional gender roles of her time. Her father also had unconventional views of his daughter's education, as he fully supported her endeavors, which was extremely unusual for the 18th century. Her brother James attended Harvard College and became a noted patriot and lawyer. What little of his correspondence with Mercy survives suggests that James encouraged Mercy's academic and literary efforts, treating her as an intellectual equal and confidante.

She married James Warren on November 14, 1754. After settling in Plymouth, James inherited his father's position as sheriff. His previous occupations included farming and merchanting. Throughout their lives, they wrote letters of respect and admiration to each other. These exchanges of adoration showed both a mutual respect and an enduring bond between the two. James would write from Boston, "I have read one Excellent Sermon this day & heard two others. What next can I do better than write to a Saint," and Mercy would then respond, "Your spirit I admire- were a few thousands on the Continent of a similar disposition we might defy the power of Britain." They had five sons, James (1757–1821), Winslow (1759–1791), Charles (1762–1784), Henry (1764–1828), and George (1766–1800).

Her husband James had a distinguished political career. In 1765, he was elected to the Massachusetts House of Representatives. He became speaker of the House and president of the Massachusetts Provincial Congress. He also served as paymaster to George Washington's army for a time during the American Revolutionary War. Mercy Warren actively participated in the political life of her husband. The Warrens became increasingly involved in the conflict between the American colonies and the British Government. Their Plymouth home was often a meeting place for local politics and revolutionaries including the Sons of Liberty. Warren became increasingly drawn to political activism, and she hosted protest meetings in her home. With the assistance of her friend Samuel Adams, these meetings laid the foundation for the Committees of correspondence. Warren wrote, "no single step contributed so much to cement the union of the colonies."

She wrote: "Every domestic enjoyment depends on the unimpaired possession of civil and religious liberty." Mercy's husband James encouraged her to write, fondly referring to her as the "scribbler", and she became his chief correspondent and sounding board.

Revolutionary writings and politics
Warren formed a strong circle of friends with whom she regularly corresponded, including Abigail Adams, John Adams, Martha Washington and Hannah Winthrop, wife of John Winthrop. In a letter to Catharine Macaulay she writes: "America stands armed with resolution and virtue; but she still recoils at the idea of drawing the sword against the nation from whom she derived her origin. Yet Britain, like an unnatural parent, is ready to plunge her dagger into the bosom of her affectionate offspring."  

She became a correspondent and advisor to many political leaders, including Washington, Samuel Adams, John Hancock, Patrick Henry, Thomas Jefferson, and especially John Adams, who became her literary mentor in the years leading to the Revolution. In a letter to James Warren, Adams writes, "Tell your wife that God Almighty has entrusted her with the Powers for the good of the World, which, in the cause of his Providence, he bestows on few of the human race. That instead of being a fault to use them, it would be criminal to neglect them." 

She had already become acquainted with John Adam’s cousin, Samuel, as he was a frequent visitor to the Otis and Warren homes when he and other politicians, including Patrick Henry, traveled to Boston. Adams himself had suggested the basic content of the poem, while his request that Warren write was probably due to Warren's close friendship with his wife, Abigail. Not sure how her writing would be received, Warren consulted with her friend Abigail Adams about John Adams' opinion of her work. John Adams was pleased with the anonymous poem and published it on the front page of the Boston Gazette. It was also Adams who had urged her  to write a history of the Revolution even while the war was still being fought. For this work, she was able to use her own memory of the Revolution,  but she solicited copies of congressional debates, letters, and other information from the active participants in the revolution, many of whom she knew personally and through her family connections 

Before and during the Revolution, the Warren home served as a gathering place for patriot debates and meetings, allowing Mercy Warren to meet patriot leaders and their wives. In addition, her husband, James, was on the Massachusetts Committee of Correspondence and among other official positions served as the paymaster of the Continental Army in 1776, a time when Mercy Warren would travel between home and the army to serve as her husband’s secretary. Her elite and privileged status in the midst of such a dramatically evolving political situation allowed her as a woman entry into the inner circles of revolutionary activity and debate. Not only did she come to know as individuals many of the most important political figures of her times, but she also formed strong opinions about many of them and some like Adams became influential in her literary life. Among those she met was George Washington, whom she described from their first meeting as “one of the most amiable and accomplished gentlemen, both in person, mind, and manners….”  Years later, in 1790, she would ask Washington to approve her History, which he did. Another friend, Jefferson helped her get subscriptions for this work. Unfortunately, this same creation also contributed to the bitterness that rose between Warren and John Adams. After the Revolution, Mercy disagreed with Adams' strong Federalism and sided with Jeffersonian Republicanism. She openly expressed her opinion in the harshest of terms in her historical account of Adams, ending one of the most productive friendships of the revolutionary period. As with John Adams, John Hancock, who had once wavered about the question of independence from Britain, also fell out of favor with the Warrens.  

She wrote several plays, including the satiric The Adulateur (1772). Directed against Governor Thomas Hutchinson of Massachusetts, The Adulateur foretold the War of Revolution. It was published as a part of a longer play by an unknown author without Warren's consent in 1773. One of the main characters in Warren's part of the play is "Rapatio", who represented Hutchinson. Because Warren was a Whig and Hutchinson was a Tory, Warren disagreed with Hutchinson's views. Therefore, Rapatio is the antagonist in The Adulateur. The protagonist is "Brutus", whom Warren created to represent her brother, James Otis. In the play, the characters that are Whigs are brave, independent people. The characters that are Tories are selfish and rude. The play includes a happy ending for the Whigs. After the play was published, Hutchinson actually become known as Rapatio to citizens of Massachusetts who identified with the Whigs. Because her first play was so successful and she thoroughly enjoyed writing about politics, Warren did not stop there.

In 1773, she wrote The Defeat, also featuring a character based on Hutchinson. Hutchinson had no idea the accuracy of her plot nor completely comprehended the impact she made on his political fate. Warren's assistance in the movement to remove Governor Hutchinson from his position through The Defeat was one of her greatest accomplishments, and she allowed the piece a rare happy ending. Warren began to doubt as she wrote the third installment in her trilogy, feeling the power of her satire compromised her divine purpose to be a "member of the gentler sex," but she found encouragement from Abigail Adams, who told her, "God Almighty has entrusted [you] with Powers for the good of the World". With this affirmation, Warren then provided her sharpest political commentary yet: in 1775 Warren published The Group, a satire conjecturing what would happen if the British king abrogated the Massachusetts charter of rights. The anonymously published The Blockheads (1776) and The Motley Assembly (1779) are also attributed to her. In 1788, she published Observations on the New Constitution, whose ratification she opposed as an Anti-Federalist.

Warren was one of the most convincing Patriots in the Revolution and her works inspired others to become Patriots. Her work earned the congratulations of numerous prominent men of the age, including George Washington and Alexander Hamilton, who remarked, "In the career of dramatic composition at least, female genius in the United States has outstripped the male".

Post-Revolutionary writings and politics

All of Warren's works were published anonymously until 1790, when she published Poems, Dramatic and Miscellaneous, the first work bearing her name. The book contains eighteen political poems and two plays. The two plays, called "The Sack of Rome" and "The Ladies of Castille," deal with liberty, social and moral values that were necessary to the success of the new republic.

In 1805, she completed her literary career with a three-volume History of the Rise, Progress, and Termination of the American Revolution. President Thomas Jefferson ordered subscriptions for himself and his cabinet and noted his "anticipation of her truthful account of the last thirty years that will furnish a more instructive lesson to mankind than any equal period known in history." The book's sharp comments on John Adams led to a heated correspondence and a breach in her friendship with Adams, which lasted until 1812. In response to the book Adams fumed in a letter to a mutual friend “History is not the province of the ladies.”

Death and legacy
Warren died on October 19, 1814, at the age of 86, six years after her husband died in 1808. She is buried at Burial Hill, Plymouth, Massachusetts.  

Although at first dubious about the proper role of women as propagandists, she succumbed to the urgings of her friends and accepted her duty to use her talents for the patriot cause. Her interest in current events blossomed into the skills of a self-taught historian, with a romanticized style of the sort readers of contemporary literature expected. Like the fiction of the day, her historiography pointed toward moral lessons, and a plays and histories reflected her partisanship against the faction around Governor Hutchinson, or around the Hamiltonian Federalists in the national capital. Historians no longer read her for factual details, but they do find her a valuable source on the mood among intellectuals in the Revolutionary era and the early nation. Feminists debate whether she could be considered one of them, for her expressed approach was traditional, with some impatience shown at the restraints. She did strongly encourage women writers while stressing the cheerful performance of household duties.

Warren proved her ability to resonate to her colonial audience, both men and women. She was willing to put forth work calling out the authoritative power while raising a family but was humble and practical in how she presented the commentary through quieter presentations. She told her son, "The thorns, the thistles, and the briers, in the field of politics seldom permit the soil to produce anything… but ruin to the adventurer", yet the public would not let her retire from commentating on the political conflicts of her later days.  

The SS Mercy Warren, a World War II Liberty ship launched in 1943, was named in her honor. In 2002, she was inducted into the National Women's Hall of Fame in Seneca Falls, New York. She is remembered on the Boston Women's Heritage Trail. Her great-great-grandson, Charles Warren, became a distinguished lawyer and historian.

References

Further reading
 
 
 Davies, Kate. Catharine Macaulay and Mercy Otis Warren: The Revolutionary Atlantic and the Politics of Gender. Oxford: Oxford University Press, 2005.
 Davies, Kate, "Revolutionary Correspondence: Reading Catharine Macaulay and Mercy Otis Warren," Women's Writing: the Elizabethan to Victorian Period. 2006 13:1, 73–97.
 Ellis, Joseph J. The Passionate Sage: The Character and Legacy of John Adams. Norton, 1993. 
 Franklin, Benjamin V. and Warren, Mercy Otis. The Plays and Poems of Mercy Otis Warren. Delmar, New York: Scholars' Facsimiles & Reprints, 1980. Print.
 Friedman, Lawrence J. and Shaffer, Arthur H. "Mercy Otis Warren and the Politics of Historical Nationalism." New England Quarterly 1975 48(2): 194–215. in JSTOR
 Gelles, Edith B. "Bonds of Friendship: the Correspondence of Abigail Adams and Mercy Otis Warren" Proceedings of the Massachusetts Historical Society 1996 108: 35–71. 
 King, Martha J. "The “pen of the historian”: Mercy Otis Warren's History of the American Revolution." Princeton University Library Chronicle 72.2 (2011): 513-532. online
 Lane, Larry M. and Lane, Judith J. "The Columbian Patriot: Mercy Otis Warren and the Constitution." Women & Politics 1990 10(2): 17–32. 
 
 Oreovicz, Cheryl Z. "Mercy Otis Warren (1728–1814)" Legacy 1996 13(1): 54–64.  Fulltext online at Swetswise
 Richards, Jeffrey H. Mercy Otis Warren. (Twayne's United States Authors Series, no. 618.) Twayne, 1995. 195 pp.; reviewed in William and Mary Quarterly 1996 54(3): 659–61. Fulltext of review in Jstor
 Shalev, Eran. "Mercy Otis Warren, the American Revolution and the Classical Imagination." Transatlantica. Revue d’études américaines. American Studies Journal 2 (2015). online
 Stuart, Rubin, Nancy. The Muse of the Revolution: The Secret Pen of Mercy Otis Warren and the Founding of a Nation. Beacon Press, 2008.
 Tarantello, Patricia F. "Insisting on Femininity: Mercy Otis Warren, Susanna Rowson, and Literary Self-Promotion." Women's Studies 46.3 (2017): 181–199.
 Wood, Gordon S. "The Authorship of the Letters from the Federal Farmer" (in Notes and Documents). William and Mary Quarterly. 3rd Ser., Vol. 31, No. 2. (Apr., 1974), pp. 299–308.
 Zagarri, Rosemarie. A Woman's Dilemma: Mercy Otis Warren and the American Revolution. Harlan Davidson, 1995.
 Zagarri, Rosemarie. A Woman's Dilemma: Mercy Otis Warren and the American Revolution. Wiley-Blackwell, 2015.

Primary sources
 Warren, Mercy Otis. The Rise, Progress and Termination of the American Revolution, Interspersed with Biographical, Political and Moral Observations. Ed. and Ann. by Lester H. Cohen (2 vols.) Liberty Classics, 1988 (modern reprint of orig. 1804 edition).
 Warren, Mercy Otis. Mercy Otis Warren: Selected Letters (University of Georgia Press, 2010).

External links
 Michals, Debra. "Mercy Otis Warren". National Women's History Museum. 2015.

1728 births
1814 deaths
18th-century American dramatists and playwrights
Anti-Federalists
Historians of the United States
People of colonial Massachusetts
Otis family
People of Massachusetts in the American Revolution
People from Barnstable, Massachusetts
Women in the American Revolution
Writers from Massachusetts
American women dramatists and playwrights
19th-century American women writers
18th-century American women writers
19th-century American dramatists and playwrights
Burials at Burial Hill
Pseudonymous women writers
18th-century pseudonymous writers
19th-century pseudonymous writers